Housefull is an Indian comedy film series. The series stars Akshay Kumar and Ritesh Deshmukh in all the films. The first two films Housefull and Housefull 2 were directed by Sajid Khan. The third film, Housefull 3, was directed by Sajid-Farhad and fourth film Housefull 4 was directed by Farhad Samji. The series is produced by Sajid Nadiadwala under his banner Nadiadwala Grandson Entertainment. Each film starts with a fresh story unrelated with the preceding film's story. However, the theme and the pace remains the same.

Despite a mixed critical reception from the critics, the series has been commercially successful, grossing all over ₹ 800 crore worldwide. It is currently the highest grossing comedy film franchise in Indian cinema as well as 7th highest-grossing Indian film series  of all time in general.

Films and overview

Housefull (2010)

Aarush, is a jinxed loser who stays with his friend, Bob and his wife, Hetal, both working at a casino owned by Mr.Kishore Samtani. Although at first Hetal is displeased with Aarush's presence, he proves to be a kind-hearted man looking for family. Bob and Hetal decide to get him married to their boss' daughter, Devika Samtani. After the marriage, on their honeymoon in Italy, Devika leaves him for her long-time American boyfriend Benny. Dejected, Aarush tries to commit suicide by drowning in the sea but is saved by a girl Sandy.

Sandy originally thinks Aarush is a pervert, but when Aakhri Pasta, the owner of Italy's biggest hotel where Aarush was spending his honeymoon with Devika, tells Sandy that Aarush is a widower, she befriends him and slowly falls in love with him. What she does not know, is that Aakhri Pasta was only joking. She then finds out his wife is alive and leaves him, but he tells her the whole truth to make her understand and she accepts him.

The only way Aarush can get married to Sandy is by convincing her elder brother, Major Krishna Rao, a strict Indian Military Intelligence officer who loves and is over-protective of Sandy. Meanwhile, Hetal, in an attempt to reconcile, lies to her father, Batuk Patel, that Bob owns a mansion and they have a child. The four rent a mansion to make him believe that Bob owns it, but Batuk accidentally believes that Aarush is married to Hetal, and Bob is the cook. Then, Krishna turns up, much to Aarush's horror, leading to more lies.

For half of the term, the four must pretend that the mansion is owned by Bob, and the rest must pretend that Aarush owns it. An overly suspicious Krishna sees Bob and Hetal working at the casino and uses a lie detector to find the truth. After Sandy objects, Krishna apologises and agrees to Aarush and Sandy's marriage. The whole family is invited to the Royal Palace, to see Krishna get rewarded by the Queen of England. While this is happening, 2 workers are meant to be installing air conditioning gas for the place, however instead they accidentally supply the hall with laughing gas causing everyone to break into an outburst of laughter. During this laughter, the truth is let out but no one seems to be in the right state of mind.

The 2 workers meanwhile stop the gas from spreading – everyone comes back to their senses. Aarush is still telling Krishna the truth, leading Krishna to break off Sandy's engagement. However, after Sandy tearfully pleads with him, Krishna lets the two get married. In the end, Hetal and Bob live together with Batuk Patel, and Aarush's luck changes for the better.

Housefull 2 (2012)

The two cousins Heena and Bobby, daughters of the Kapoor family, hate each other very much. They start quarrelling over something relating to their duties of Animals' Law Authority. Their fathers, Chintu and Dabboo, are step-brothers who hate each other to the very core. Even their wives hate each other. Chintu wants the richest son-in law for his daughter, Heena, while Dabboo too wants the same for his daughter, Bobby. Aakhri Pasta, a marriage counsellor, is ordered by both Chintu and Dabboo to find the best son-in-law. Aakhri Pasta brings Mr. Babani to discuss Babani's son Jai.

When Chintu misinterprets one of Aakhri's comments, he verbally abuses Babani while shouting. Babani suffers from a condition that affects his heart when he hears loud noises. Due to Chintu's shouting, Babani suffers a heart attack, landing him in a hospital. Babani's son Jai learns of this, is angered, then vows revenge, telling his friend Jolly/Jwala, who is the son of billionaire J.D., to go to Chintu, agree to marry his daughter and then break off the wedding at the last minute. Jolly is busy trying to introduce his girlfriend to his own father and does not want to get involved. He suggests Max, their former college mate and a thief, to do the job. Jay goes with Max as his driver but somehow, they end in the wrong house and go to Dabboo's house.

Jay and Max later find out their mistake. Jai, still wanting revenge, doesn't know what to do and Jolly suggests another former sleazy college mate, Sunny. Jolly goes with Sunny as his bodyguard because Max and Sunny are sworn enemies and as Dabboo's house and Chintu's house are right next to each other, their plan may get destroyed. Sunny and Jolly encounter a crocodile and Max and Jay encounter a snake. They manage to survive the attack.

While Heena and Bobby are on a cruise, they accidentally end up on an island. Max and Sunny become friends again, while Heena and Bobby become friends. They find a resort and go home. Dabboo gets Jolly (Max) engaged to Bobby and Chintu gets Jolly (Sunny) engaged to Heena. The day of the engagement, Chintu blindfolds Jolly, Sunny, Jai and Heena and takes them to J.D.'s house. After seeing the real Jolly holding Sunny's garland, J.D. believes that Jolly got engaged to Heena. Luckily, Sunny convinces him. Jolly calls them at midnight and reveals his father's secret of being Jagga Daaku. He also reveals that his real name is Jwala. After Sunny fools Chintu, Chintu calls Dabboo in excitement and tells him that his daughter, Heena, is getting married to Jolly, the son of J.D. Confused, and believing Max to be Jolly, Dabboo takes Max and Bobby to J.D.'s mansion. Sunny handles the situation well by fooling J.D. by taking the name of his religion and tells him that Max is Jolly's friend and Bobby is Max's fiancé (though actually it is true) and Max's father is against his and Bobby's marriage. J.D. then welcomes Bobby, Max and her family to his house and tells them to stay there up to Bobby and Max's marriage.

Batuk Patel arrives with his daughter Parul to make things worse. Jay and Jwala come to receive them from the airport. But when they see Parul, Jay and Jwala lie that Jay is Jolly. Parul becomes happy hearing this as they secretly love each other. Jelo gives Jwala the ultimatum  – take me to your house or forget me. To help Jwala, Sunny lies to J.D., saying that Jelo is his fiancé, and J.D. again agrees to let her live there as Sunny takes the name of his religion. Sunny and Max lie to their respective fathers-in-law that the other guy is the son of J.D. and a maid servant in the mansion. This creates a lot of confusion.

When Sunny's father as well as Max's 'Guru' tells them never to break anyone's heart, Sunny and Max tell the truth to Heena and Bobby. Enraged, Bobby and Heena slap Max and Sunny respectively and tell them that they never want to see their faces again. But thinking that instead of telling the truth, Sunny and Max could have done more wrong with them, the two sisters pardon the two boys on the very next day. There Jay and Jolly also let off their plan of revenge on Kapoors on Jay's father's advice. Then Henna proposes Sunny in Sunny's style and Bobby proposes Max in Max's style.

On the day of the four couples' marriage, J.D. and the other brides' fathers learn the truth about the grooms and that they have been lying all this time. Finally Bobby and Heena convince their fathers to forget their enmity and live together as blood brothers. Chintu and Dabboo join hands and so do their wives. But J.D. was not convinced by them telling the truth, so he turns back into Jagga Daku and starts frightening the families with his gun. He tries to shoot Sunny with his gun as Sunny runs towards J.D. to save him from the falling chandelier and then he understands what was happening. In the end, all the grooms get married to their respective girlfriends.

Housefull 3 (2016)

Six years ago in London, three robbers attempted to steal jewels from a building, but were stopped by the police and arrested. In the present, Batook Patel is a wealthy and successful businessman with three beautiful daughters: Ganga, Jamuna, and Saraswati. However, he does not want his daughters to get married, as he claims that all the women in his family are cursed if they get married.

One night, at a friend's bachelorette party, the girls reveal to their friend that secretly, they each have a boyfriend. Jamuna's boyfriend is Teddy, who wants to be a racecar driver. Teddy is skilled at racing, but during an important race, his car runs out of gas, and loses. Saraswati's boyfriend is Bunty, who wants to be rapper. During a talent competition, the judge claims that his rapping talent is ordinary. Bunty then raps in Hindi swear words at the judge. Unfortunately, the judge knows Hindi, and disqualifies him. Ganga's boyfriend is Sandy, who wants to be a professional football/soccer player. During tryouts for a team, the coach, who is racist, tells him he cannot join, and calls him a "Bloody Indian", which triggers Sandy's evil personality, Sundi, to come out and attack the coach and team. Sandy learns that Sundi comes out whenever he hears the word "Indian", and his Dissociative Identity Disorder comes from being depressed about not having enough money to make a living. Sandy sees Batook's success in the paper, and decides to date his doctor, and Batook's daughter, Ganga. When the girls tell their dad that they each have a boyfriend, Batook goes to his friend, Aakhri Pasta, who owns an Italian restaurant. Batook convinces Pasta to dress up as the family's fortune teller, Aakhri Aasta. Aasta claims that when Ganga's husband first steps foot into Batook's house, Jamuna's husband first sees Batook, or when Saraswati's husband first speaks to Batook, then Batook will have a heart attack, and die. The girls, wanting to keep their boyfriends, have them fake disabilities. Sandy rides around in a motorized wheelchair, and claims he can't use his feet. Teddy wears sunglasses and uses a cane, and claims he is blind. Bunty uses sign language, and claims that he is mute. Batook decides to test the boys to make sure if they are really disabled, by putting ants in Sandy's pants, having Teddy jump in an empty pool, and injuring Bunty to see if he screams. When Batook is out of the house, the boys reveal themselves to each other as not being disabled. Since they all want Batook's money, they decide not to tell on each other, as they each have a recording of the other. At Pasta's restaurant, Batook reveals to Pasta that his daughters are actually the daughters of Urja Nagre, an underworld crime lord. Nagre was caught when someone informed the police. While in jail, Nagre requested Batook take care of his daughters in London, but make sure that they never found out that Nagre was their father. Batook also reveals that he was the one who informed the police, and did not want the girls to marry until his sons(the robbers in the beginning of the film) got out of prison. Unbeknownst to him, Nagre is out of prison, and has arrived in London.

While the girls prepare a wax statue for Batook, the boys go into town, where some gangsters are teasing some girls. Suddenly, Nagre appears, and attack the gangsters. After the gangsters run away, Nagre sees the boys, and ask why did not help. The boys claim that they were disabled. Bunty, who was in the wheelchair at the time, claims he was crippled. Sandy, holding Teddy's cane, claims he is blind, and that Teddy is mute. Later, Nagre goes to Batook's office, and ask him about his daughters's future husbands. Batook says that while the girls' future husbands are disabled, he knows three normal men who are suitable for the daughters. Batook takes Nagre to a Gurdwara to see his sons, Rishi, Rohan, and Rajeev, claiming they are orphans who do community service. Nagre decides that the three are suitable for his daughters.

At Batook's house, Nagre claims that Batook owes Nagre 5000 crores (50 billion) of British Pounds. Nagre gives Batook and the boys 10 days to make up the money, or Ganga, Jamuna, and Saraswati must marry Rishi, Rohan, and Rajeev. During these 10 days, Nagre and his "sons" will also live in Batook's house, meaning that while in front of both Batook and Nagre, Sandy, Teddy, and Bunty must act as blind-disabled, mute-blind, and disabled-mute. Sandy, Teddy, and Bunty come up with a plan to get rid of Nagre's sons. During a St. Patrick's Day party, the girls get Rishi, Rohan, and Rajeev drunk. The next day, they tell each other that they had sex with their respective girls, only to find out that they had sex with the maids. The maids request compensation, or they will sue, of 50 million Pounds. Nagre, learning this, says that the girls will marry the boys of their choosing.

The next day, the girls take Sandy, Teddy, and Bunty to church, asking for forgiveness. Saraswati, who takes care of disabled children, tells them that two boys were mocking a child because of his disability. The girls feel guilty, because they felt that they were mocking people with disabilities by having the boys act as if they were blind, crippled, and mute. After this, the boys feel guilty, as they were only marrying the girls for money. They go to the warehouse area of Madame Tussaud's to meet their girlfriends. They instead find Batook's sons, who explain that they found out the boys were normal. While Teddy and Bunty fight Batook's sons' gang members, Sandy has accidentally heard Teddy say "Indian", and Sundi, Sandy's alternate personality, tries to kill Sandy. Batook arrives, and blackmails the boys that Nagre's fortune of 50 million will be divided into 7 parts: Rishi, Rohan, Rajeev, Batook, Sandy, Teddy, and Bunty's shares. Sundi says to divide it into 8 shares, as Sandy/Sundi counts as two people. Aakhri Pasta arrives, and demands his share, splitting it into 9 parts. However, the three maids each demand two shares, one for them, and the other for their unborn children they are now carrying. Nagre then arrives, and explains that he found a recording on Bunty's laptop, which revealed that Bunty, Sandy, and Teddy were not disabled. Nagre also overheard Batook, who told his sons that he was responsible for getting Nagre in prison. Nagre then attempts to kill everyone in the warehouse, while the lights turn on and off. As the girls arrive, Rishi, Rohan, and Rajeev see them, and hold them at knifepoint in front of Nagre. Sandy, Teddy, and Bunty then rush to save the girls, injuring themselves in the process. As they lay in the girls arms, the boys tell the truth to the girls, and Batook explains how Nagre is their father. The girls forgive the boys, and reconcile with Nagre.

Housefull 4 (2019)

Harry is a barber who frequently gets bizarre flashes of a past era. He runs a barber shop in London with his brothers Roy and Max. The three brothers had misplaced a bag of 5 million pounds which belonged to gangster Michael Bhai. His henchman Big Bhai constantly demands the money. To fulfil this demand, the three brothers get engaged to the three daughters of London's rich business tycoon Thakral (Ranjeet): Harry is dating Pooja, Roy is dating Neha and Max is dating Kriti. Mysterious circumstances cause the destination wedding to take place in Sitamgarh, India. On arriving in Sitamgarh, Aakhri Pasta, a bellboy at their hotel, recognises them as reincarnations of people that lived 600 years ago, i.e. in 1419. Harry realises that the flashes he sees have something to do with what Pasta was talking about and drives to the nearby town of Madhavgarh, where he starts to see the flashes clearly.

In 1419, Rajkumar Bala Dev Singh of Madhavgarh was banished by his father, Maharaj Parikshitap, since Bala tried to kill him to become King. Bala's servant Pehla Pasta informs him of Sitamgarh - a nearby kingdom whose King, Maharaj Surya Singh Rana, is looking for grooms for his three daughters: Rajkumari Madhu, Rajkumari Mala and Rajkumari Meena. Bala plans to marry Rajkumari Madhu, the eldest Princess, so that he becomes the King of Sitamgarh.

Bala meets Bangdu Maharaj, an effeminate dance teacher who has an affair with Mala. Meena is secretly in love with the brave bodyguard of the three princesses, Dharamputra. Bala helps the two couples get together and enlists their help for uniting him with Madhu. The plan works and Maharaj Surya Singh Rana announces the wedding of Madhu with Bala, Mala with Bangdu Maharaj, and Meena with Dharamputra. However, Suryabhan, Surya Singh Rana's nephew, wants the throne for himself. He kills the brother of Sitamgarh's enemy clan's leader, Gama and frames the three couples for it. On the day of the wedding, Gama storms into the fort and fights them to avenge his brother. During the fight, Bala realises that he now truly loves Madhu, even though initially she was just the path to the throne for him. During the fight, the wedding mandap (altar) collapses and kills the three couples along with Gama.

Back in the present, Harry realises that the grooms are getting married to the wrong brides. Pasta helps Harry remind Roy and Max of their lives as Bangdu Maharaj and Dharamputra, respectively. Just then, they are introduced to Pappu Rangeela, a qawwali singer and a family friend of the girls. He is the reincarnation of Gama but has no recollection of his past life. Meanwhile, Pasta finds a painting of their past lives' wedding day which shows Bala with Madhu, Bangdu with Mala, and Dharamputra with Meena. Before they can show this painting to the girls to remind them of their past lives, it gets in the hands of Pappu Rangeela and he remembers his life as Gama.

Pappu crashes the wedding and a fight ensues. The fight makes Pooja and Neha remember everything. Soon, Michael Bhai, now revealed to be the reincarnation of Suryabhan, shows up at the wedding for his money and shoots Gama. Kriti remembers everything when she sees Michael Bhai and also tells everyone that the wedding mandap hadn't collapsed on its own – it was broken down by Suryabhan to kill everyone so that he could be King. Michael Bhai recounts his past life and boasts how he got Gama's brother killed. Pappu Rangeela hears this and pushes Michael Bhai into the collapsing mandap, thus getting his revenge.

The film ends on a happy note with Harry, Roy and Max getting married to Kriti, Pooja and Neha, thus competing their 600-year-old love story.

Cast

Housefull
 Akshay Kumar as Aarush Awasthi 
 Riteish Deshmukh as Babu "Bob" Rao
 Deepika Padukone as Saundarya "Sandy" Bhagayalaxmi Venkateshwari Basapa Rao
 Arjun Rampal as Major Krishna Rao
 Lara Dutta as Hetal Patel
 Jiah Khan as Devika
 Boman Irani as Batuk Patel
 Chunkey Pandey as Akhri Pasta
 Malaika Arora Khan as Pooja
 Randhir Kapoor as Kishore Samtani
 Jacqueline Fernandez as Dhanno (Special appearance in song "Aapka Kya Hoga")
 Daisy Irani as Batuk Patel's mother
 Lillete Dubey as Zulekha Bano
 Vindu Dara Singh as security guard
 Suresh Menon as Santa Singh
 Manoj Pahwa as Banta Singh

Housefull 2

 Akshay Kumar as Sunny Pujari "Sunil" -Heena's husband
 Asin Thottumkal as Heena K. Pujari-Chintu and Sweety's daughter, Sunny's wife
 Jacqueline Fernandez as Bobby Mehta-Dabboo and Dolly's daughter, Max's wife
 John Abraham as Max Mehrotkar -Bobby's husband
 Riteish Deshmukh as Jwala aka Jolly-J.D.'s son, Jelo's husband
 Zareen Khan as Jelo-Jolly's wife
 Shazahn Padamsee as Parul Babani-Batuk's daughter, Jai's wife
 Shreyas Talpade as Jai Babani-Virendra's son, Parul's husband
 Rishi Kapoor as Chintu Kapoor-Sweety's husband, Heena's father
 Ranjeet as Dr. Ranjeet V. Asna K. Pujari-Sunny's father
 Randhir Kapoor as Dabboo Kapoor-Dolly's husband, Bobby's father
 Neelu Kohli as Dolly Kapoo—Dabboo's wife, Bobby's mother
 Mithun Chakraborty as J.D. (Jagga Daaku)-Jwala/Jolly's father
 Johnny Lever as Mithai Patil-J.D.'s right hand
 Boman Irani as Batuk Patel-Parul's father
 Virendra Saxena as Mr. Babani-Jai's father
 Chunkey Pandey as Akhri Pasta
 Malaika Arora Khan as Anarkali/Hetal/Sarla (special appearance)

Housefull 3

 Akshay Kumar as Sandy / Sundi "Sanket" Sahgal 
 Abhishek Bachchan as Bunty
 Riteish Deshmukh as "Teddy" Tukaram Chaugule 
 Jacqueline Fernandez as Ganga Patel 
 Lisa Haydon as Jamuna Patel
 Nargis Fakhri as Saraswati Patel
 Boman Irani as Batuk Patel
 Jackie Shroff as Urja Nagre
 Chunkey Pandey as Aakhri Pasta
 Samir Kochhar as Rishi Kaapoor
 Nikitin Dheer as Rohan
 Aarav Chowdhary as Rajeev

Housefull 4

 Akshay Kumar as Harry / Rajkumar Bala Dev Singh: Harry is a barber who forgets things that just happened when he hears a loud noise. He is the reincarnation of Rajkumar Bala Dev Singh, a menacing prince who desires for the throne.
 Riteish Deshmukh as Roy / Bangdu Maharaj: Roy is a barber and Max and Harry's brother. He often mixes up genders while speaking. He is the reincarnation of Bangdu Maharaj, an effeminate royal dance teacher.
 Bobby Deol as Max / Dharamputra: Max is a barber and Roy and Harry's brother. He is short-tempered and often resorts to punching. He is the reincarnation of the brave warrior, Dharamputra.
 Kriti Sanon as Kriti / Rajkumari Madhu: Kriti is Max's fiancée and the reincarnation of Rajkumari Madhu, who was Bala's fiancée.
 Pooja Hegde as Pooja / Rajkumari Mala: Pooja is Kriti and Neha's sister, Harry's fiancée and the reincarnation of Rajkumari Mala, who was Bangdu Maharaj's fiancée.
 Kriti Kharbanda as Neha / Rajkumari Meena: Neha is Kriti and Pooja's sister, Roy's fiancée and the reincarnation of Rajkumari Meena, who was Dharamputra's fiancée.
 Chunky Pandey as Aakhri Pasta / Pehla Pasta: Aakhri Pasta is a bellboy who remembers everything from his past life as Pehla Pasta, who was Bala's servant.
 Rana Daggubati as Pappu Rangeela / Gama: Pappu is a qawwali singer and the reincarnation of Gama, an extremely strong tribal leader who wants to avenge his brother.
 Ranjeet as Thakral / Raja Surya Singh Rana: Thakral is a rich business tycoon and the reincarnation of a King named Surya Singh Rana.
 Sharad Kelkar as Michael Bhai / Suryabhan: Michael Bhai is a gangster and the reincarnation of Suryabhan.
 Johnny Lever as Winston Churchgate
 Jamie Lever as Giggly
 Nawazuddin Siddiqui as Ramsey Baba
 Manoj Pahwa as Big Bhai
 Parikshit Sahni as Maharaja Parikshitap
 Archana Puran Singh as Harry, Roy and Max's mother (photo only)
 Shakti Kapoor as Harry, Roy and Max's father (photo only)
 Sham Mashalkar as Darbari
 Prithvi Zutshi as Siskeria
 Saurabh Srivastava as Lakhan

Cast and characters

Crew

Box office

Music 
The music is composed by Shankar-Ehsaan-Loy in first film and Sajid-Wajid in second installment. In third film, Songs are composed by Sharib-Toshi, Sohail Sen, Mika Singh, Tanishk Bagchi and Millind Gaba. And in fourth installments, It is composed by Sohail Sen, Farhad Samji and Sandeep Shirodkar.

The whole movies soundtrack rights are by T-Series due to Nadiadwala Grandson Entertainment's lifetime contract with Bhushan Kumar.

Awards and nominations

Housefull
6th Apsara Film & Television Producers Guild Awards
Nominated – Apsara Award for Best Performance in Comic Role – Riteish Deshmukh

2011 Zee Cine Awards
Nominated
Best Director – Sajid Khan
Best Actor – Akshay Kumar
Best Music – Shankar Ehsaan Loy
Best Supporting Actress – Lara Dutta
Best Comedian – Riteish Deshmukh
Zee Cine Award for Best Track of the Year – "Aapka Kya Hoga (Dhanno)"

IIFA Awards
Won
Best Performance in a Comic Role – Riteish Deshmukh

Stardust Awards
Won
Star of the Year – Male – Akshay Kumar
Best Supporting Actor – Arjun Rampal

Housefull 2
IIFA Awards
Nominated
IIFA Award for Best Supporting Actress - Jacqueline Fernandez

Housefull 3
Stardust Awards
Nominated
Best Actress Female - Jacqueline Fernandez

References

2010s Hindi-language films
Indian film series
Comedy film series